Chaetoglobosin A is a fungal isolate with anticancer activity in vitro. Derivatives of the compound include MBJ-0038, MBJ-0039, and MBJ-0040.

Biosynthesis 
Chaetoglobosin A biosynthesis begins with a product from hybrid PKS-NRPS encoded by the gene CHGG_01239, followed by multiple oxidations which form different intermediates depending on the order of functional groups oxidized. The PKS-NRPS product undergoes a diels alder, to form prochaetoglobosin I (2) and is subsequently oxidized in different paths as shown in the scheme. Either the epoxide is created first to form prochaetoglobosin IV (5), followed by di-hydroxylation to form 20-dihydrochaetoglobosin A (6), and a final oxidation of one hydroxyl to ketone to form chaetoglobosin A, or di-hydroxylation of (2) occurs first, forming cytoglobosin D (3), followed by one hydroxyl oxidation to form chaetoglobosin J (4), and lastly epoxidation to form chaetoglobosin A. Epoxidation of (3) can also occur prior to hydroxyl oxidation to form (6).

References

Tryptamines
Epoxides